Uleyevo (Üläy) is a rural locality (a village) in Badrakovsky Selsoviet, Burayevsky District, Bashkortostan, Russia. The population was 137 in 2010. There are two streets.

Geography 
Uleyevo is located 19 km southwest of Burayevo (the district's administrative centre) by road. Berlyachevo is the nearest rural locality.

References 

Rural localities in Burayevsky District